King of Prussia (also referred to as KOP) is a census-designated place in Upper Merion Township in Montgomery County, Pennsylvania, United States. As of the 2020 census, its population was 22,028. The community took its unusual name in the 18th century from a local tavern named the King of Prussia Inn, which was named after King Frederick the Great of Prussia. Like the rest of Montgomery County, King of Prussia continues to experience rapid development. One of the largest shopping malls in the United States, King of Prussia, is located here. Also located here is the headquarters of the Nuclear Regulatory Commission Region I. King of Prussia is considered to be an edge city of Philadelphia, consisting of large amounts of retail and office space situated at the convergence of four highways.

History

The eponymous King of Prussia Inn was originally constructed as a cottage in 1719 by the Welsh Quakers William and Janet Rees, founders of Reesville. The cottage was converted to an inn in 1769 and did a steady business in colonial times as it was approximately a day's travel by horse from Philadelphia. Settlers headed west to Ohio would sleep at the inn on their first night on the road. In 1774 the Rees family hired James Berry to manage the inn, which henceforth became known as "Berry's Tavern". General George Washington first visited the tavern on Thanksgiving Day in 1777 while the Continental Army was encamped at Whitemarsh; a few weeks later Washington and the army bivouacked at nearby Valley Forge.

Parker's spy map, created by William Parker, an American Loyalist, listed the inn as "Berry's" in 1777, but a local petition in 1786 identified it as the "King of Prussia". It was possibly renamed in honor of Benjamin Franklin's pro-American satirical essay "An Edict by the King of Prussia". At some point a wooden signboard of the inn depicted King Frederick II (Frederick the Great) of Prussia. The inn is listed on the National Register of Historic Places.

The inn was forced to move with the expansion of U.S. Route 202. U.S. 202 is a major north–south highway that passes through the town from southwest to northeast. Its construction as a modern expressway would have caused the destruction of the King of Prussia Inn; however, historic preservationists managed to prevail upon the state of Pennsylvania to avoid this important structure by building north and southbound lanes on either side of it. For more than a quarter century the inn was marooned on a median island, with motor traffic whizzing past on both sides. It was sealed up for years, surrounded by a high fence. The inn was successfully relocated in 2000 and re-opened to the public in October 2002.

The extensive suburban development that has taken place since the 1960s in King of Prussia has led urban planning scholars like Joel Garreau to label the area as an epitome of the edge city phenomenon, a situation where the most vibrant economic growth and prosperity in a metropolitan area (in this case, Philadelphia) no longer occurs in the urban center, but rather at its periphery. Before 1960, the Greater King of Prussia area was known for little more than being the place of Washington's winter respite in 1777-8 (see Valley Forge National Historical Park). The growth in King of Prussia developed around the convergence of four highways with the construction of the King of Prussia mall, a large business park, and housing developments.

Daniel Berrigan and his brother Philip Berrigan began their Plowshares Movement at the General Electric Weapons Plant in King of Prussia in 1980. That event and the subsequent court proceedings surrounding the 'Plowshares Eight' were dramatically depicted by Emile de Antonio in the 1983 motion picture In the King of Prussia.

In the late 1980s, developer Dennis Maloomian acquired a golf course near the King of Prussia mall and planned a mixed-use residential and retail development that would include a town center for King of Prussia. The proposed development needed to be rezoned but Upper Merion Township officials and local residents were opposed to the plans. After several court battles, the Pennsylvania Supreme Court ruled in Maloomian's favor in 2003. The planned development became known as the Village at Valley Forge and would include a suburban downtown, apartments, townhouses, and offices. The retail area would be known as the King of Prussia Town Center. The first part of the town center was completed in 2014 with the opening of a Wegmans grocery store. This was followed by the construction of the downtown area with several stores and restaurants. Offices are being constructed and residential areas are in development.

By the 2000s, the business park in King of Prussia was outdated and was losing tenants. By 2009, several office building owners pushed for Upper Merion Township to improve the business park. Improvements were made to King of Prussia including landscaping the median of US 202, installing King of Prussia signs at the borders to the community, creating a shuttle service connecting the business park to nearby train stations, and changing the zoning laws to allow for apartments and townhouses to be constructed in the business park. The vacancy rates at the business park have since dropped.

In 2016, the two sections of the King of Prussia mall, The Plaza and The Court, were joined to create one large shopping mall after an expansion corridor was built.

Geography 

There is no incorporated city of King of Prussia, although the United States Postal Service office there has carried that name since 1837. Its ZIP code is 19406. King of Prussia's boundaries, as defined by the Census Bureau, are the Schuylkill River to the north, U.S. Route 422 to the west, Bridgeport to the east, and I-76 to the south. However, the Greater King of Prussia Area is often cited to include Bridgeport, parts of Wayne and Radnor Township, King Manor, as well as most of Gulph Mills. The local fire department carries the King of Prussia name, whereas the police department and the school district carry the Upper Merion name.

The area is served by area codes 610 and 484.

Demographics

As of the 2010 census, the CDP was 69.4% White Non-Hispanic, 5.7% Black or African American, 0.3% Native American, 18.6% Asian, and 2.1% were two or more races. 4.2% of the population were of Hispanic or Latino ancestry. 22.4% of the population was foreign-born.

As of the census of 2000, there were 18,511 people, 8,245 households, and 4,773 families residing in the CDP. The population density was 2,202.4 people per square mile (850.8/km2). There were about 8,705 housing units at an average density of 1,035.7/sq mi (400.1/km2). The racial makeup of the CDP was 82.70% White, 10.62% Asian, 4.26% Black or African American, 0.16% Native American, 0.04% Pacific Islander, 0.84% from other races, and 1.39% from two or more races. 1.91% of the population were Hispanic or Latino of any race.

There were 8,245 households, out of which 21.1% had children under the age of 18 living with them, 49.2% were married couples living together, 6.3% had a female householder with no husband present, and 42.1% were non-families. 33.1% of all households were made up of individuals, and 8.1% had someone living alone who was 65 years of age or older. The average household size was 2.22 and the average family size was 2.89.

In the CDP, the population was spread out, with 17.6% under the age of 18, 8.4% from 18 to 24, 35.1% from 25 to 44, 22.2% from 45 to 64, and 16.7% who were 65 years of age or older. The median age was 37 years. For every 100 females, there were 97.6 males. For every 100 females age 18 and over, there were 96.1 males.

The median income for a household in the CDP was $62,012, and the median income for a family was $75,882. Males had a median income of $50,803 versus $37,347 for females. The per capita income for the CDP was $32,070. 3.2% of the population and 1.6% of families were below the poverty line. 1.8% of those under the age of 18 and 2.1% of those 65 and older were living below the poverty line.

Climate
The climate in this area is characterized by hot, humid summers and cool to cold winters. According to the Köppen Climate Classification system, King of Prussia has a humid continental climate, abbreviated "Dfa" on climate maps.

Economy

King of Prussia has an unemployment rate of 4.30% and an annual job growth of about 1.44% and 38% over the next ten years.  A large portion of that comes from the King of Prussia mall, the third largest shopping complex in the United States by shopping area square footage and the numerous employers in the area. The King of Prussia mall consists of over 450 stores, including several luxury retailers, and 8 anchor stores. The mall attracts 22 million visitors annually and produces $1.1 billion in annual sales. A large business park is located to the northwest of the King of Prussia mall, with over 60 commercial and industrial companies on 676 acres. There are about 60,000 people employed in King of Prussia, which is three times the resident population.

King of Prussia is home to the headquarters of Nuclear Regulatory Commission Region I, which oversees 25 nuclear power reactors at 16 nuclear power plants in the Northeastern United States.

According to Upper Merion Township's 2010 Comprehensive Annual Financial Report,

In addition, major commercial property owners in King of Prussia formed an organization in 2010 called the King of Prussia District (KOP-BID) that works to improve the physical environment, market the area, and advocate for zoning, tax and transportation policies that will keep King of Prussia competitive in the region.

Sports
The  Philadelphia Freedoms tennis team of World TeamTennis played in King of Prussia in 2008 and 2009. Whenever a tennis event was to occur, a temporary tennis stadium that seated 3,000 was constructed in the parking lot of the King of Prussia mall.  Eventually, the Freedoms left for The Pavilion at Villanova University in 2010.

Education

Schools
Public school students in the King of Prussia area attend schools in the Upper Merion Area School District. The district is served by five elementary schools: Bridgeport, Caley, Candlebrook, Gulph and Roberts. All students in the Upper Merion Area School District also attend Upper Merion Area Middle School and Upper Merion Area High School.

King of Prussia also has a private school, Mother Teresa Regional Catholic School. It was formed in 2012 by the merger of Mother of Divine Providence in King of Prussia and St. Teresa of Avila in West Norriton.

Colleges
The Penn State Great Valley campus was once located in King of Prussia from 1963 to 1974 before relocating to Great Valley.  In 1982, the college opened up a new facility called Penn State King of Prussia Center.

Points of interest

King of Prussia is home to the King of Prussia mall, which is the third largest mall in the United States in terms of leasable space. The mall consists of over 450 stores, 8 anchor stores, and over 40 restaurants. The mall has several luxury stores that have their only Philadelphia area location in King of Prussia. The King of Prussia mall is surrounded by several big-box stores, restaurants, hotels, and other businesses, including a United Artists Theatres and an iFLY indoor skydiving center.  The King of Prussia Town Center is a lifestyle center that consists of Wegmans, multiple other big-box retailers, and a downtown area with dining, retail, and service establishments and a Town Square. The town center is part of the Village at Valley Forge, a 122-acre mixed-use development under construction that consists of retail, apartments, townhouses, condominiums, office space, and the Children's Hospital of Philadelphia's "Specialty Care and Surgery Center".

King of Prussia is also the location of the Valley Forge Casino Resort, which has over 500 hotel rooms, 600 slot machines, table games, sports betting, seven restaurants, a spa, nightlife, a convention center, and a seasonal poolside club called Valley Beach. Valley Forge National Historical Park, which consists of the site where General George Washington and the Continental Army made their encampment at Valley Forge during the winter of 1777–78 in the American Revolutionary War, is located to the west of King of Prussia. 

King of Prussia is home to the King of Prussia Volunteer Fire Company 9/11 Memorial honoring the lives lost in the September 11 attacks. The memorial, which was dedicated by the King of Prussia Volunteer Fire Company on the 10th anniversary of the attacks in 2011, consists of two steel beams recovered from Ground Zero at the World Trade Center in New York City. The 9/11 Memorial is located adjacent to the King of Prussia Volunteer Fire Company station on Allendale Road across from the King of Prussia mall.

Infrastructure

Transportation

King of Prussia has retained its role as an important crossroads throughout United States history. In addition to the Inn, from the earliest days, the intersection supported two general stores. Today, four major highways meet in or near the center of King of Prussia. The US 422 freeway begins at US 202 near the center of town and heads northwest to Pottstown and Reading; thanks to reconstruction in 2000, motorists can now travel directly from Reading to Philadelphia without passing onto US 202. US 202 is the only major highway that becomes a surface road through the area, heading southwest towards West Chester as a freeway and northeast towards Norristown as Dekalb Pike, a surface road. Important local roads in King of Prussia include PA 23, which runs through King of Prussia between Valley Forge and Bridgeport along Valley Forge Road; Gulph Road, which runs from PA 23 near Valley Forge National Historical Park and heads southeast to junctions with I-76 and US 202 near the King of Prussia mall before leading to Gulph Mills; and Henderson Road, a north–south road through King of Prussia that intersects PA 23 and US 202 before ending at Gulph Road near an interchange with I-76. 

Pennsylvania Department of Transportation District 6, which serves Bucks, Chester, Delaware, Montgomery, and Philadelphia counties, is headquartered in King of Prussia.

In addition, SEPTA Suburban Division bus route  runs from Gulph Mills to the Willow Grove Park Mall in Willow Grove. The Gulph Mills station is served by SEPTA's Norristown High Speed Line, which runs between the 69th Street Transportation Center and the Norristown Transportation Center.

The Greater Valley Forge Transportation Management Association operates The Rambler as a community shuttle around the King of Prussia area Monday through Saturday, serving residential areas, shopping centers, the King of Prussia mall, medical facilities, the Upper Merion Senior Center, and the Upper Merion Township Municipal Building. Taxicab and limousine service in King of Prussia is provided by three companies. Carpooling is available in King of Prussia, with the Delaware Valley Regional Planning Commission offering a service that can match commuters with transit services, carpools, vanpools, and walking and bicycling options.

OurBus provides intercity bus service from King of Prussia to Park Avenue in the Manhattan section in New York City as part of a route running from Lancaster to New York City. The bus stop in King of Prussia is located at the King of Prussia Park and Ride, a park and ride lot on King of Prussia Road. The route started on December 21, 2017. Fullington Trailways provides intercity bus service from the King of Prussia Park and Ride along a route serving the Philadelphia Greyhound Terminal in Philadelphia, Harrisburg, State College, and DuBois. Greyhound Lines also has a bus stop at the King of Prussia Park and Ride.

Norfolk Southern Railway operates freight trains through King of Prussia along the Harrisburg Line that follows the Schuylkill River and the Dale Secondary that follows US 202 and the Pennsylvania Turnpike. The Abrams Yard operated by Norfolk Southern Railway is located in King of Prussia on the Harrisburg Line.

There are several trails for hiking and bicycles that serve the King of Prussia area, some of which are under development. The Schuylkill River Trail connects Valley Forge National Historical Park via Sullivan's Bridge across the Schuylkill River to the Manayunk section of Philadelphia, following the riverbank. A section of the Chester Valley Trail passes through King of Prussia; when complete, the trail will run  between Norristown, where it will connect to the Schuylkill River Trail, and Exton.

Utilities
Electricity and natural gas in King of Prussia is provided by PECO Energy Company, a subsidiary of Exelon. Water in the King of Prussia area is provided by Aqua Pennsylvania, a subsidiary of Aqua America, and Pennsylvania American Water, a subsidiary of American Water. The Upper Merion Township Public Works Department provides wastewater service to King of Prussia. Trash and recycling collection in King of Prussia is provided by private haulers.

Health care 

Einstein Healthcare Network operates an outpatient healthcare facility in King of Prussia. The Children's Hospital of Philadelphia's  "Specialty Care and Surgery Center" opened in King of Prussia in 2015.  The Gulph Road facilities includes practices in sports medicine, oncology, and pediatric imagery.  The facility is part of a larger site known the Village at Valley Forge. On January 26, 2022, the Children's Hospital of Philadelphia opened the Middleman Family Pavilion, an  hospital, in King of Prussia.

Notable people
The Bloodhound Gang – A comedic rock band originating in the early '90s from King of Prussia.
Jobriath Boone – Folk and glam rock musician and actor, and the first openly gay rock musician signed to a major record label.
Charlie Brenneman – Mixed martial arts competitor.
Brianna Butler – Basketball player in the Women's National Basketball League.
William Colepaugh – American seaman who became a German spy during World War II.
Michael J. Fitzgerald – Roman Catholic priest who is an auxiliary bishop of the Archdiocese of Philadelphia. 
Greg Gianforte – Businessman, former U.S. Representative from Montana, and Governor of Montana.
Kathy Jordan – Professional tennis player.
Ann Li – Tennis player.
Bill Nuttall – Former soccer player and owner of Golden Viking Sports.
Bob Odell – Former football halfback and coach.
Rafael Robb – Economist and former college professor who confessed to murdering his wife.
Jonathan Roberts – U.S. Representative and U.S. Senator from Pennsylvania in the 19th century.
Lisa Salters – ESPN sports reporter.
Fred Sherman – Economist, businessman, and business commentator.
Artie Singer – Songwriter, music producer, and bandleader.
Jay C. Smith – Former principal at Upper Merion Area High School who was convicted of murder.
Blair Thomas – Former National Football League running back.

References

External links

Upper Merion Township
King of Prussia Historical Society
King of Prussia Chamber of Commerce at Valley Forge
King of Prussia District

Census-designated places in Montgomery County, Pennsylvania
Populated places established in 1719
Census-designated places in Pennsylvania
1719 establishments in Pennsylvania
Upper Merion Township, Montgomery County, Pennsylvania